Veronaea is a genus of ascomycete fungi, classified in the family Herpotrichiellaceae. The genus was defined by R. Ciferri and A. Montemartini in 1958.

Species of Veronaea grow relatively well in culture, producing sparingly branched, brownish conidiophores with geniculate, sympodial conidiogenous cells with flat, unthickened scars, each producing single 1–septate conidia. The cosmopolitan V. botryosa  has 2(–4) celled conidia and although found in soil and other organic matter, it frequently causes skin infections in immunocompromized humans.

References

External links 
Mycobank

Ascomycota enigmatic taxa
Eurotiomycetes genera